"The Heart Is a Muscle" is a song by Australian alternative rock band Gang of Youths, released in August 2017 as the twelfth track from their second studio album Go Farther in Lightness (2017). The song peaked at number 37 on the US Adult Alternative Songs chart, becoming the band's first charting track on this chart. The song was certified gold in Australia in 2019.

The song placed third in the 2018 Vanda & Young Global Songwriting Competition.

At the ARIA Music Awards of 2018, Patrick Rohl received a nomination for ARIA Award for Best Video.

"The Heart Is a Muscle" was used by Fox Sports (Australia) to promote the 2018 NRL season.

Music video
The music video was released on 29 November 2017.

Track listings

Charts

Certifications

References

2017 singles
2016 songs
Gang of Youths songs